The 2016 USA Sevens was the third tournament within the 2015–16 World Rugby Women's Sevens Series. It was held over the weekend of 8–9 April 2016 at Fifth Third Bank Stadium in the Atlanta suburb of Kennesaw, Georgia. Australia won the tournament, defeating New Zealand by 24–19 in the final.

Format
The teams were drawn into three pools of four teams each. Each team played everyone in their pool one time. The top two teams from each pool advanced to the Cup/Plate brackets while the top 2 third place teams will also compete in the Cup/Plate. The rest of the teams from each group went to the Bowl brackets.

Teams

Pool Stage

Pool A

Pool B

Pool C

Knockout stage

Bowl

Plate

Cup

References

External links
Official website

2016
2015–16 World Rugby Women's Sevens Series
2016 in women's rugby union
2016 in American rugby union
rugby union
2016 rugby sevens competitions
2016 in sports in Georgia (U.S. state)